The Dumping Ground: I'm... is a television spin-off of British children television series The Dumping Ground. It is a webisode series that began airing prior to series 4. The series consisted of 10 episodes.

Series 2 of 'The Dumping Ground, I'm...'  returned in February 2017, and featured characters, Mike, May-Li, Finn and Toni and Billie, presenting themselves. 

Series 3 returned once more in May 2021  in the days leading up to the premiere of Series 9, with updated presentations from Jody, Floss, Sasha, and Finn and new presentations from Candi-Rose, Jay, Bird, Sid, Taz, and Tracy Beaker.

Cast
Mike Milligan - Connor Byrne (Series 1–2)
Carmen Howle - Amy-Leigh Hickman (Series 1)
Tee Taylor - Mia McKenna-Bruce (Series 1)
Tyler Lewis - Miles Butler-Hughton (Series 1)
Jody Jackson - Kia Pegg (Series 1–present)
Floss Guppy - Sarah Rayson (Series 1–present)
Mo Michaels - Reece Buttery (Series 1)
May-Li Wang - Stacy Liu (Series 1–present)
Bailey Wharton - Kasey McKellar (Series 1)
Kazima Tako - Akuc Bol (Series 1)
Ryan Reeves - Lewis G Hamilton (Series 1–2)
Toni Trent - Nelly Currant (Series 1–2)
Billie Trent - Gwen Currant (Series 1–2)
Finn McLaine - Ruben Reuter (Series 1–present)
Sasha Bellman - Annabelle Davis (Series 1–present)
Chloe Reeves - Hannah Moncur (Series 2–3)
Dexter Bellman - Alexander Aze (Series 2)
Candi-Rose - Carma Hylton (Series 2–present)
Bird Wallis - Leo James (Series 3–present)
Tracy Beaker - Dani Harmer (Series 3)
Jay Wallis - Cole Wealleans-Watts (Series 3–present)
Taz De Souza - Jasmine Uson (Series 3–present)
Sid Khan - Josh Sangha (Series 3–present)

Episodes

Series 1 (2016)

Series 2 (2017)

Series 3 (2021)

References

External links
 
The Dumping Ground - CBBC

2010s British children's television series
2016 British television series debuts
2016 British television series endings
BBC children's television shows
The Story of Tracy Beaker
The Dumping Ground
Tracy Beaker series